Hathor 16 - Coptic Calendar - Hathor 18

The seventeenth day of the Coptic month of Hathor, the third month of the Coptic year. On a common year, this day corresponds to November 13, of the Julian Calendar, and November 26, of the Gregorian Calendar. This day falls in the Coptic season of Peret, the season of emergence. This day falls in the Nativity Fast.

Commemorations

Saints 

 The departure of Saint John Chrysostom
 The departure of Saint Paul of the Danfeek Mountain

References 

Days of the Coptic calendar